Miana Chak is a town and union council of Gujrat District, in the Punjab province of Pakistan. It is part of Kharian Tehsil and is located at 32°43'20N 74°8'0E with an altitude of 247 metres (813 feet).

References

Union councils of Gujrat District
Populated places in Gujrat District